Group A of the 2001 Fed Cup Americas Zone Group I was one of two pools in the Americas Zone Group I of the 2001 Fed Cup. Four teams competed in a round robin competition, with the top team advancing to the Group I play-off, the winner of which would advance to the bottom section of the World Group Play-offs, and the bottom team being relegated down to 2002 Group II.

Canada vs. Ecuador

Brazil vs. Paraguay

Canada vs. Paraguay

Brazil vs. Ecuador

Canada vs. Brazil

Paraguay vs. Ecuador

  failed to win any ties in the pool, and thus was relegated to Group II in 2002. However, they did not compete next year.

See also
Fed Cup structure

References

External links
 Fed Cup website

2001 Fed Cup Americas Zone